Carpindolol is a beta blocker.

References

Beta blockers
Carboxylate esters
Isopropyl esters
N-tert-butyl-phenoxypropanolamines
Indoles